Christopher Mark Clarkson (born 12 November 1982) is a British Conservative Party politician who has been the Member of Parliament (MP) for Heywood & Middleton since the 2019 general election. Prior to entering Parliament, Clarkson was a Salford City Councilor for Worsley.

Early life and career
Clarkson was born to Terence Clarkson and Alison Clarkson (née Parker) in Wegberg, North Rhine-Westphalia, West Germany. He grew up in Blackburn, Lancashire where he attended St Wilfrid's Church of England High School, before studying law at Dundee University. He has worked for IRIS Legal as a corporate development manager, and was a consultant at Virgin from 2010 to 2019.

Political career 
Clarkson is a member of the Countryside Alliance and a supporter of Brexit. He identifies as a One Nation Conservative, as well as a member of the Tory Reform Group. Prior to being elected to Parliament, he was a Salford City councillor between 2011 and 2019. Whilst on the council, he was chair of the Audit and Accounts Committee from 2016 to 2018.

He was elected as the MP for Heywood and Middleton in the 2019 general election with a majority of 663 (1.4%). Clarkson had previously unsuccessfully contested the seat in the 2017 general election and the Wallasey seat in the 2015 general election.

On 22 October 2020, Clarkson criticised Mayor of Greater Manchester Andy Burnham in a parliamentary debate over his disagreements with the government concerning financial support for stricter COVID-19 restrictions, accusing Burnham of "opportunism". In response, Clarkson was called "scum" by Deputy Leader of the Labour Party Angela Rayner. She later apologised, stating: "I apologise for the language that I used in a heated debate in Parliament earlier."

On 10 November 2020, Clarkson was appointed as Parliamentary Private Secretary to the Ministry of Justice.

In November 2022, following the outcome of a coroner's court hearing into the 2020 death of Awaab Ishak (a two-year-old child who died from black mould in his house, which occurred in the constituency of Rochdale, not Clarkson’s constituency of Heywood & Middleton), he called the company who provided the housing (Rochdale Boroughwide Housing, or RBH) "modern day slum lords". He said that he has photographs from his constituents living in RBH properties showing that the poor living conditions seen in Ishak's home were "not an isolated incident".

Personal life
Clarkson is openly gay. He is a member of the Carlton Club in London, and St James' Club in Manchester.

References

External links 

Living people
UK MPs 2019–present
Conservative Party (UK) MPs for English constituencies
Conservative Party (UK) councillors
English LGBT politicians
LGBT members of the Parliament of the United Kingdom
Councillors in Greater Manchester
People from Ribble Valley (district)
Alumni of the University of Dundee
1982 births
Gay politicians
21st-century LGBT people